Streptomyces calidiresistens is a bacterium species from the genus of Streptomyces which has been isolated from hot spring sediment from the Hehua hot spring in Tengchong in China.

See also 
 List of Streptomyces species

References

Further reading

External links
Type strain of Streptomyces calidiresistens at BacDive – the Bacterial Diversity Metadatabase

calidiresistens
Bacteria described in 2014